The Manchester Street Railway was a light interurban railway that ran from Manchester to Nashua, New Hampshire.

History 

The Manchester Horse Railroad Company was incorporated in 1864. The company changed its name to the Manchester Street Railway in 1889, which in turn was renamed the Manchester Traction Light & Power Company in 1901. In 1903 the Goff's Falls, Litchfield & Hudson Street Railway Company was incorporated. In 1905 the Manchester Street Railway's main car barn burned down, so they ordered 11 Laconia cars numbered 94 - 116 in even numbers. Many of the Manchester Street Railway's cars were manufactured by the Laconia Car Company in Laconia, New Hampshire. The Goff's Falls, Litchfield & Hudson Street Railway Company was renamed the Manchester and Nashua Street Railway in 1907. Near the end, the railway couldn't afford to keep lines energized after hours, and scrappers would climb the poles and dismantle the lines. The Manchester Street Railway ceased operations in 1939, and most of their equipment was scrapped by 1941. The Seashore Trolley Museum's first preserved equipment was obtained from the Manchester Street Railway.

Preservation

Preserved rolling stock 
There are several Manchester Street Railway cars preserved and operational.

 No. 38 was built in 1906. It is the last trolley to cross the Merrimack River and the second car in the Seashore Trolley Museum's collection in Kennebunkport, Maine.
 The Seashore Trolley Museum has a private Brill parlor car from 1898 fully restored and operational.
 The Connecticut Trolley Museum has Manchester Street Railway No. 94 stored, but unrestored. In 1905 the Manchester Street Railway's main car barn burned down, so they ordered 11 Laconia cars numbered 94 - 116 in even numbers.
 The Seashore Trolley Museum has Brill No. 60 from 1895 in storage unrestored.

See also 
 Concord and Claremont Railroad
 Boston and Maine Railroad
 Maine Central Railroad Company
 List of New Hampshire railroads
 Springfield Electric Railway

References

External links 
 Manchester Street Railway Gallery at Nashua City Station

Manchester, New Hampshire
Standard gauge railways in the United States
Nashua, New Hampshire
Light rail in New Hampshire